The Association of Business Historians is a British learned society focused on business history and the history of companies concerned with "The study of all aspects of the historical development of enterprise, businesses and business activity generally and their inter-relationship with the social, cultural, economic and political environment."

In 2009 it was one of The National Archives' partners in the production of a National Strategy for Business Archives (England and Wales) (2009).

Activities 

The association organises an annual conference and an annual Tony Slaven Doctoral Workshop, named for Tony Slaven, one of the association's founders. It awards the annual Coleman Prize, named for business historian D. C. Coleman, for a recent Ph.D. thesis in the area of business history, and the Tony Slaven Grant.

History 
The Association of Business Historians was founded in 1990 to promote the study of business history following on from the establishment of the Business Archives Council in 1934.

T S Ashton regarded business history as “ simply a branch of economic history focusing on industry and the firm”. Even in the 1960s Peter Payne argued that business history was “that branch of economic history that finds its source material primarily in company records and takes its starting point the entrepreneur and the firm...it is the grass roots approach to economic history”.

At Liverpool in 1958, Francis Hyde launched the journal Business History , and a year later, in 1959, Peter Payne was appointed as Colquhoun Lecturer in Business History at the University of Glasgow, under Sydney Checkland. This was the first named lectureship in business history in Britain. This led in 1960 to the establishment of the Business Archives Council (Scotland), to begin surveying and saving from destruction the records of Scottish Business. In the 1960s the post Robbens expansion of the universities, especially of the social sciences, greatly increased academic posts in economic history and economics, and triggered much new research and writing in the history of business, but not then any demand for a separate identity for the subject.

A number of important initiatives followed in the 1970s, especially the founding of the annual Business History Seminar, funded by the Economic and Social Research Council (ESRC), and hosted by Derek Oddy. This was first held at Ealing Technical College, and from 1978 at the Polytechnic of Central London (now University of Westminster). The 1978 move to the Polytechnic of Central London coincided with the establishment of the Wadsworth Prize by the Business Archives Council, an annual award for a distinguished publication in business history.

From 1980 the Business History Unit launched its Newsletter to reach out to the growing community of researchers and teachers of business history, and to provide a forum for posting news of seminars, conferences, publications, and research initiatives. London was not the sole locus of growing activity in business history. In Scotland, at Glasgow, thirty years of investment in business history culminated in 1987 in the founding and funding of The Centre for Business History in Scotland. Tony Slaven was appointed as Director of the Centre, the post also holding the Chair in Business History. This was a permanently funded research centre, the resources provided by the Aggregate Foundation. It was consequently independent of the need to secure funds by accepting commissioned business histories. Another significant innovation developed from 1988. Geoff Jones, now Isidor Straus Professor of Business History at Harvard Business School, had moved from the Business History Unit to the Department of Economics at Reading. From there he initiated a highly fruitful and intensive series of business history workshop collaborations with the business historians at Lancaster University, who were also within the Department of Economics. These meetings, which resulted in multiple edited books, reflected the institutional locations of the groups with their emphasis on bringing together “history and theory”, and involving economists in their deliberations.

While these initiatives were proliferating, the main forum for business historians still focused on the small annual seminar at the Polytechnic of London. Attendance was limited and by invitation only, but it did allow for informal exchanges on how to promote the discipline. Particularly involved in such discussions were Geoff Jones, Mary Rose and Tony Slaven, each representing a well established base in business history. The private funding available to Tony Slaven also made it possible for the CBH to lubricate exchanges. All three were in agreement that the key to taking Business History forward was institutionalisation through a new and separate professional organisation with regular conferences, these steps establishing for it an identity that was distinct from the Economic History Society.

There was a feeling at the time that the Economic History Society Conference had little to offer those with an interest in Business History, and that if a new association was established it would build beyond the London-based seminars, and pull in a wider audience. The first meeting to establish a British organisation for business history took place on 27 September 1989, in the new premises of the Centre for Business History in Glasgow . The room was packed with business historians from across Britain, and was quite tense. This was partly because the meeting coincided with the editorial shift of Business History away from the BHU to Royal Holloway, Reading and Lancaster which heightened suspicions of empire building by some of the parties involved. By the end of the afternoon it had been agreed to form a pre Committee consisting of Tony Slaven, Geoff Jones, Terry Gourvish, Derek Oddy and Oliver Westall to develop a constitution, plan elections and launch a new Association.

The founders were also keen to build an association that would be less formal and more open than the Economic History Society. The drafting of the constitution stressed the need for a small set of active officers with a regular turnover, with all members entitled to vote. The objective of the Association of Business Historians is ‘to promote the study, teaching and publication of all aspects of the history of business and industry, and of the environment in which they operate’. The first elections were held in September 1990 and the first Council was formed of Derek Oddy (President), Geoff Jones (Vice President), Tony Slaven (Secretary Treasurer), Terry Gourvish (Newsletter Editor), Mary Rose (Membership Secretary) and David Jeremy as Council Member.

The two challenges of that first year involved building the membership and launching the first conference. It took place exactly two years after that first meeting on 27–28 September 1991, at the Centre for Business History in Scotland, in what would become a biennial series of meetings until 2000.

The association's Ph.D. prize was introduced in 1997 at the joint British/American conference held in Glasgow and the first winner was Steve Toms. In 2000 the prize became annual and was named the Coleman Prize. Each year the prize winner joins the council to ensure that new researchers become embedded in the networks and practices of the association.

The Association of British Historians also had an early influence on the formation of the European Business History Association. Discussions began in 1993 between Geoff Jones, Tony Slaven and Hans Pohl and were soon extended to include Mary Rose, Keetie Sluytermann, Rolv Petter Amdam and Per Boje at a meeting in Glasgow in the autumn of 1993. A series of meetings followed in Bonn, Rotterdam and Reading. The EBHA was formally launched at the business history conference held in Rotterdam in October 1994 with its inaugural conference following in Gothenburg in August 1996.

References

External links

Learned societies of the United Kingdom
Economic history of the United Kingdom
History of business
Economic history societies